Alexander Mikhailovich Prokhorov (born Alexander Michael Prochoroff, ; 11 July 1916 – 8 January 2002) was an Australian-born Soviet-Russian physicist known for his pioneering research on lasers and masers in the Soviet Union for which he shared the Nobel Prize in Physics in 1964 with Charles Hard Townes and Nikolay Basov.

Early life
Alexander Michael Prochoroff was born on 11 July 1916 at Russell Road, Peeramon, Queensland, Australia (now 322 Gadaloff Road, Butchers Creek, situated about 30 km from Atherton), to Mikhail Ivanovich Prokhorov and Maria Ivanovna (née Mikhailova), Russian revolutionaries who had emigrated from Russia to escape repression by the tsarist regime. As a child he attended Butchers Creek State School. 

In 1923, after the October Revolution and the Russian Civil War, the family returned to Russia. In 1934, Prokhorov entered the Saint Petersburg State University to study physics. He was a member of the Komsomol from 1930 to 1944. Prokhorov graduated with honors in 1939 and moved to Moscow to work at the Lebedev Physical Institute, in the oscillations laboratory headed by academician N. D. Papaleksi. His research there was devoted to propagation of radio waves in the ionosphere. At the onset of World War II in the Soviet Union, in June 1941, he joined the Red Army. During World War II, Prokhorov fought in the infantry, was wounded twice in battles, and was awarded three medals, including the Medal For Courage in 1946. He was demobilized in 1944 and returned to the Lebedev Institute where, in 1946, he defended his Ph.D. thesis on "Theory of Stabilization of Frequency of a Tube Oscillator in the Theory of a Small Parameter".

Research
In 1947, Prokhorov started working on coherent radiation emitted by electrons orbiting in a cyclic particle accelerator called a synchrotron. He demonstrated that the emission is mostly concentrated in the microwave spectral range. His results became the basis of his habilitation on "Coherent Radiation of Electrons in the Synchrotron Accelerator", defended in 1951. By 1950, Prokhorov was assistant chief of the oscillation laboratory. Around that time, he formed a group of young scientists to work on radiospectroscopy of molecular rotations and vibrations, and later on quantum electronics. The group focused on a special class of molecules which have three (non-degenerate) moments of inertia. The research was conducted both on experiment and theory. In 1954, Prokhorov became head of the laboratory. Together with Nikolay Basov he developed theoretical grounds for creation of a molecular oscillator and constructed such an oscillator based on ammonia. They also proposed a method for the production of population inversion using inhomogeneous electric and magnetic fields. Their results were first presented at a national conference in 1952, but not published until 1954–1955;

In 1955, Prokhorov started his research in the field of electron paramagnetic resonance (EPR). He focused on relaxation times of ions of the iron group elements in a lattice of aluminium oxide, but also investigated other, "non-optical", topics, such as magnetic phase transitions in DPPH. In 1957, while studying ruby, a chromium-doped variation of aluminium oxide, he came upon the idea of using this material as an active medium of a laser. As a new type of laser resonator, he proposed, in 1958, an "open type" cavity design, which is widely used today. In 1963, together with A. S. Selivanenko, he suggested a laser using two-quantum transitions. For his pioneering work on lasers and masers, in 1964, he received the Nobel Prize in Physics shared with Nikolay Basov and Charles Hard Townes.

Posts and awards

In 1959, Prokhorov became a professor at Moscow State University – the most prestigious university in the Soviet Union; the same year, he was awarded the Lenin Prize. In 1960, he became a member of the Russian Academy of Sciences and elected Academician in 1966. In 1967, he was awarded his first Order of Lenin (he received five of them during life, in 1967, 1969, 1975, 1981 and 1986). In 1968, he became vice-director of the Lebedev Institute and in 1971 took the position of Head of Laboratory of another prestigious Soviet institution, the Moscow Institute of Physics and Technology. In the same year, he was elected a member of the American Academy of Arts and Sciences. In 1983 he was elected a Member of the German Academy of Sciences Leopoldina. Between 1982 and 1998, Prokhorov served as acting director of the General Physics Institute of the Russian Academy of Sciences, and after 1998 as honorary director. Prokhorov was a Member and one of the Honorary Presidents of the International Academy of Science, Munich and supported 1993 the foundation and development of the Russian Section of International Academy of Science, Moscow.

In 1969, Prokhorov became a Hero of Socialist Labour, the highest degree of distinction in the Soviet Union for achievements in national economy and culture. He received the second such award in 1986. Starting in 1969, he was the chief editor of the Great Soviet Encyclopedia. He was awarded the Frederic Ives Medal, the highest distinction of the Optical Society of America (OSA), in 2000 and became an Honorary OSA Member in 2001. The same year, he was awarded the Demidov Prize.

He died on 8 January, 2002 at Moscow and was buried at Novodevichy Cemetery.

Politics
Prokhorov became a member of the Communist Party in 1950. In 1983, together with three other academicians – Andrey Tychonoff, Anatoly Dorodnitsyn and Georgy Skryabin – he signed the famous open letter called "when they lose honor and conscience" (Когда теряют честь и совесть), denouncing Andrey Sakharov's article in the Foreign Affairs.

Family

Both of Prokhorov's parents died during World War II. Prokhorov married geographer Galina Shelepina in 1941, and they had a son, Kiril, born in 1945. Following his father, Kiril Prokhorov became a physicist in the field of optics and is currently leading a laser-related laboratory at the A. M. Prokhorov General Physics Institute.

Honours and awards
 Mandelstam Prize (1948)
 Lenin Prize (1959)
 Five Orders of Lenin (including 11 May 1981)
 Order of the Patriotic War, 1st class (1985)
 Nobel Prize in Physics (1964)
 Hero of Socialist Labour, twice (1969, 1986)
 Medal For Courage
 USSR State Prize (1980)
 Order of Merit for the Fatherland, 2nd class (1996)
 State Prize of the Russian Federation (1998)
 Medal Frederick Ayvesa (2000)
 Demidov Prize (2001)
 Lomonosov Gold Medal (Moscow State University, 1987)
 Award of the Council of Ministers
 State Prize of the Russian Federation in science and technology (2003, posthumously) for the development of scientific and technological foundations of metrological support of measurements of length in the microwave and nanometer ranges and their application in microelectronics and nanotechnology
 Foreign Member of the Czechoslovak Academy of Sciences (1982)
 Jubilee Medal "In Commemoration of the 100th Anniversary since the Birth of Vladimir Il'ich Lenin"
 Medal "For the Victory over Germany in the Great Patriotic War 1941–1945"
 Jubilee Medal "Twenty Years of Victory in the Great Patriotic War 1941-1945"
 Jubilee Medal "Thirty Years of Victory in the Great Patriotic War 1941-1945"
 Jubilee Medal "Forty Years of Victory in the Great Patriotic War 1941-1945"
 Medal "For Valiant Labour in the Great Patriotic War 1941-1945"
 Medal "Veteran of Labour"
 Jubilee Medal "50 Years of the Armed Forces of the USSR"
 Medal "In Commemoration of the 800th Anniversary of Moscow"
 Medal "In Commemoration of the 850th Anniversary of Moscow"

Books
A. M. Prokhorov (Editor in Chief), J. M. Buzzi, P. Sprangle, K. Wille. Coherent Radiation Generation and Particle Acceleration, 1992, . Research Trends in Physics series published by the American Institute of Physics Press (presently Springer, New York)
V. Stefan and A. M. Prokhorov (Editors) Diamond Science and Technology Vol 1: Laser Diamond Interaction. Plasma Diamond Reactors (Stefan University Press Series on Frontiers in Science and Technology) 1999 .
V. Stefan and A. M. Prokhorov (Editors). Diamond Science and Technology Vol 2 (Stefan University Press Series on Frontiers in Science and Technology) 1999 .

References

External links

  including the Nobel Lecture, 11 December 1964 Quantum Electronics
Prokhorov's role in the invention of lasers and masers
Prokhorov's grave in Novodevichy cemetery

1916 births
2002 deaths
Academic staff of Moscow State University
Academic staff of the Moscow Institute of Physics and Technology
Full Members of the USSR Academy of Sciences
Full Members of the Russian Academy of Sciences
Nobel laureates in Physics
Soviet Nobel laureates
Demidov Prize laureates
Recipients of the USSR State Prize
Lenin Prize winners
State Prize of the Russian Federation laureates
Heroes of Socialist Labour
Recipients of the Order of Lenin
Recipients of the Order "For Merit to the Fatherland", 2nd class
Recipients of the Medal "For Courage" (Russia)
Recipients of the Lomonosov Gold Medal
Australian people of Russian descent
Experimental physicists
Optical physicists
Laser researchers
Soviet inventors
Soviet physicists
Soviet military personnel of World War II
Saint Petersburg State University alumni
Australian emigrants to the Soviet Union
Communist Party of the Soviet Union members
Burials at Novodevichy Cemetery
Spectroscopists
Members of the German Academy of Sciences Leopoldina
Members of the German Academy of Sciences at Berlin